Matthew Michael Whisenant (born June 8, 1971) is an American former Major League Baseball pitcher. He was drafted by the Philadelphia Phillies in 1990 and spent the 1992 season with the Phillies' Class A affiliate in Spartanburg, South Carolina.  He was traded to the Florida Marlins with Joel Adamson for Danny Jackson in November 1992.   He spent the next five seasons in the Marlins' minor league system before making his debut against the New York Mets.  On July 29, 1997, he was traded to the Kansas City Royals for Matt Treanor.  He was then released by the Royals in August 1999 and signed as a free agent by the San Diego Padres later that month.  At the end of the 2000 season, he became a free agent and signed with the Los Angeles Dodgers on December 14 of that year.  He played for the Dodgers' Class AAA team in Las Vegas in 2001.

Early life
Matt Whisenant was born in 1971 Los Angeles, California and grew up in La Cañada Flintridge, California attending and graduating La Cañada High School in 1989. Whisenant went on to attend  Glendale Community College before going pro.

Coaching career
Whisenant returned to La Cañada Flintridge, California to coach high school baseball for La Cañada High School after coaching 9 seasons for  Village Christian School.

References

External links  

Major League Baseball pitchers
Florida Marlins players
Kansas City Royals players
San Diego Padres players
Baseball players from California
1971 births
Living people
Batavia Clippers players
Brevard County Manatees players
Charlotte Knights players
Kane County Cougars players
Las Vegas 51s players
Las Vegas Stars (baseball) players
Portland Sea Dogs players
Spartanburg Phillies players